The Afar National Democratic Party (ANDP) was a political party in Ethiopia. 
At the legislative elections held on 15 May 2005, the party won 8 seats, all from the Afar Region. The current Minister of Social Affairs and the Deputy Chairman of Pastoralist Affairs are members of the party.

It was reported that the ANDP was created in the latter half of 1999 from a merger of the Afar Liberation Front (ALF) and the Afar People's Democratic Organization with three smaller organizations—the Afar National Liberation Front, the Afar Revolutionary Democratic Unity Front (ARDUF) and the Afar National Democratic Movement. However, there have been more recent reports indicating that the ALF and ARDUF continued operate as independent organizations.

In the August 2005 Regional assembly elections, the party won 84 out of 87 seats in the Afar Region.

In December 2019, the party merged with the Amhara Democratic Party (ADP), the Benishangul-Gumuz People's Democratic Unity Front (BGPDUF), the Ethiopian Somali People's Democratic Party (ESPDP), the Gambela People's Democratic Movement (GPDM), the Hareri National League (HNL), the Oromo Democratic Party (ODP) and the Southern Ethiopian People's Democratic Movement (SEPDM) to form the Prosperity Party.

Notes

1999 establishments in Ethiopia
2019 disestablishments in Ethiopia
Defunct political parties in Ethiopia
Ethnic political parties in Ethiopia
Ethiopian People's Revolutionary Democratic Front
Political parties disestablished in 2019
Political parties established in 1999